Griffin Creek is a stream in Alberta, Canada.

Griffin Creek has the name of Thomas Griffin, a pioneer citizen.

See also
List of rivers of Alberta

References

Rivers of Alberta